Bad for Me is the fourth studio album by American jazz singer Dee Dee Bridgewater, released in 1979 on Elektra Records. The album reached at No. 29 on the Cashbox Top Jazz Albums chart and No. 30 on the Billboard Jazz Albums chart.

Overview
Bad for Me was produced by George Duke. Artists such as Sheila E., Roland Bautista, Ricky Lawson, Alphonso Johnson and Larry Dunn appeared on the album.

Singles
The title track was released as the only single and peaked at No. 37 on the Billboard Hot Soul Singles chart.

Covers
Bridgewater covered Carole Bayer Sager's "It's the Falling in Love" on the album.

Track listing

Personnel

Dee Dee Bridgewater – lead vocals, backing vocals (on tracks 3, 6, 8)
George Duke – Yamaha electric grand piano (1, 3), backing vocals (2), Fender Rhodes piano and synthesizer (9)
Bobby Lyle – Fender Rhodes piano (2), Yamaha electric grand piano (5, 8), Minimoog and clavinet (8)
Larry Dunn – Fender Rhodes piano (4, 7), Minimoog (7)
Greg Phillinganes – Fender Rhodes piano (6)
Roland Bautista – guitar (exc. 5, 9)
Byron Miller – bass (1, 2, 4, 5, 7)
Robert Matthew Powell – bass (3, 8)
Alphonso Johnson – bass (6, 9)
Ricky Lawson – drums
Sheila Escovedo – percussion (1, 2, 5, 6, 8)
Paulinho da Costa – percussion (7)
Lawrence Williams – tenor saxophone (exc. 4, 7)
Don Menza – tenor saxophone (1)
Fred Jackson – baritone saxophone (4, 7)
Jerry Hey – trumpet (exc. 2, 9), flugelhorn (2, 9)
Bobby Bryant – trumpet (4, 7)
Rahmlee Michael Davis – trumpet (4)
Sidney Muldrow, Richard Perissi – French horn (4, 7)
Napoleon Murphy Brock – trombone (2, 3), backing vocals (1, 2)
Lew McCreary – trombone (1)
George Bohanon, Louis Satterfield – trombone (4, 7)
William Frank Reichenbach Jr. – trombone (5, 6, 8, 9)
Maurice Spears – bass trombone (4, 7)
Lynn Davis – backing vocals (1-4, 7, 8)
Josie James – backing vocals (1, 3, 4, 7, 8)
Jim Gilstrap – backing vocals (4, 7)
Carolyn Dennis, Becky Lopez, Petsye Powell – backing vocals (5)

George Duke - producer, arrangements and orchestrations (1-3, 5), conductor (9)
Horn arrangements (8) - George Duke, Bobby Lyle
For tracks 4 and 7
Vocal arrangements - George Duke, Larry Dunn
Horn arrangements - Eduardo Del Barrio, Larry Dunn (4 only)
Conductor of horn section - Eduardo Del Barrio
String arrangements and conductor of string section - George Del Barrio
Gene McDaniels - Producer
Songwriters "Back of Your Mind" Gene McDaniels, Raye Stiles

Chart history

References

External links 

1979 albums
Dee Dee Bridgewater albums
Albums produced by George Duke
Elektra Records albums